David William Strachan (June 28, 1877 – August 19, 1958) was a Canadian politician. He served in the Legislative Assembly of British Columbia from 1933 to 1937 and 1938 to 1941  from the electoral district of Vancouver-Burrard, a member of the Liberal party.

References

1877 births
1958 deaths
People from Montérégie